Shurtleff College was a Baptist liberal arts school in Alton, Illinois until 1957.

History
Founded in 1827 by Reverend John Mason Peck (a Baptist missionary) as Rock Spring Seminary in St. Clair County, Illinois,  and relocated to Alton, Illinois in 1832, first as the Alton Seminary, then as Alton College, the institution was renamed again in 1836 as Shurtleff College, in honor of Dr. Benjamin Shurtleff of Boston who donated $10,000 to the college. In keeping with Baptist ideas about equality, the school came to accept women as well as men, and students of all races. This institution is both the first college in Illinois and the first between the Alleghenies and the Mississippi River

In 1910 Andrew Carnegie, the prominent industrialist and philanthropist, donated $15,000 for construction of a library. The now national science and mathematics honor society, Sigma Zeta, was founded at Shurtleff College as a local organization to provide recognition for their science and mathematics students. In a letter that appeared in the correspondence section of the American Chemical Society's Journal of Chemical Education, Sigma Zeta was offered as an alternative for small colleges to the existing Sigma Xi honor society. It had often passed over small colleges for membership as it focused on larger universities. Shurtleff College was a member of the Illinois Intercollegiate Athletic Conference from 1910-1937.

In 1950 Shurtleff reached its peak enrollment of 700 students, also seeing its highest number of graduates that year, 99. The school ceased operating as Shurtleff College on June 30, 1957, when it became part of the Southern Illinois University system. Students enrolled at Shurtleff at the time continued their education; the last twenty-eight students of Shurtleff College graduated in 1958. Shurtleff College was the oldest Baptist college west of the Appalachians until it was absorbed by Southern Illinois University.

The college's first year as an SIU campus saw a jump of enrollment to 1,200 students. In two years the enrollment doubled. The Alton campus flourished until 1965 when SIU opened a campus at nearby Edwardsville, which became Southern Illinois University Edwardsville. In 1972 SIU decided to use the Alton campus for a branch of dental medicine. In its first year as a dental school SIU enrolled twenty-four students. Currently the school carries an enrollment of approximately 200.

Notable alumni
Frank Ballard, puppeteer and Professor of Dramatic Arts at the University of Connecticut
Sam Harshany, Professional baseball player and manager, catcher for the St. Louis Browns in the 1930s and 40s.
Thomas Nelson Johnson graduated from Shurtleff in 1875, and that year married one of his students, Lucy A. Taylor, who was 20. They were the maternal grandparents of Ralph Bunche, an academic and diplomat who was the first African American and person of color to be awarded the Nobel Peace Prize. Lucy Taylor Johnson raised Ralph and his sister after their mother died when the boy was 13. (His father had abandoned the family.)
Lansing Mizner, President of the California Senate, Minister to Central America (1889-1890).
Louise Stallings (1890-1966), concert singer
Robert Pershing Wadlow enrolled in 1938. Wadlow, remembered as the "Alton Giant," was the tallest known person of all times, measuring 272 cm (8 ft 11.1 inches) in height. He was born, educated, and buried in Alton. He died aged 22.  Today a statue of Wadlow stands on the campus that was his alma mater.
Minor Watson, actor on stage and in film in the first half of the 20th century.

References

"Shurtleff College history", Illinois Intercollegiate Athletic Conference
Alton, IL: "Shurtleff College history", Illinois GenWeb
"Loomis Hall at Shurtleff College", Library, Northern Illinois University
"A Girl Goes to College in 1900", Library, Northern Illinois University

External links
 Shurtleff Retrospect Yearbooks
 Shurtleff Pioneer Student Newspaper

 
Educational institutions established in 1827
Southern Illinois University system
Alton, Illinois
1827 establishments in Illinois
Defunct private universities and colleges in Illinois
Educational institutions disestablished in 1957
1957 disestablishments in Illinois
Universities and colleges in Madison County, Illinois